The Imam Ali Mosque or the Old Mosque of Basra is the first mosque built in Basra, Iraq and among the oldest mosques in the history of Islam.

History
The mosque was founded around 635 during the era of the second Caliph Umar, at the outskirt of Basra right before the conquest of the city. Initially, the building was built from the palm canes, but the original building was later burnt down by the great fire. Later the mosque was reconstructed from the mud during the era of the 3rd Umayyad Caliph Umar II. The reconstructed building however, was destroyed again during the Abbasid era due to the great flood which submerged the city of Basra. After the majority of the Basra citizens evacuated from the old Basra to the newer part of the city, the mosque became a cultural heritage and a site for the pilgrimage to Ali and Aisha. Due to the religious importance of the mosque, the site became a location of many massacres of Arab pilgrims, especially during the Zanj Rebellion. It is considered that the first madrasa for fiqh studies, hadith studies and philosophy was established within the mosque. Some important figures of the early Islamic history were educated here, including Abd Allah ibn Abbas and Wasil ibn Ata. The madrasa was among the first to call the adoption of mind as a way to devise legal problems.

See also

 Islam in Iraq
 List of mosques in Iraq

References

7th-century mosques
Sunni mosques in Iraq
Buildings and structures in Basra